Kosmos 225 ( meaning Cosmos 225), also known as DS-U1-Ya No.2, was a Soviet satellite which was launched in 1968 as part of the Dnepropetrovsk Sputnik programme. It was a  spacecraft, which was built by the Yuzhnoye Design Bureau, and was used to investigate cosmic rays and flows of charged particles in the Earth's magnetosphere.

A Kosmos-2I 63SM carrier rocket was used to launch Kosmos 225 into low Earth orbit. The launch took place from Site 86/4 at Kapustin Yar. The launch occurred at 21:29:54 GMT on 11 June 1968, and resulted in the successful insertion of the satellite into orbit. Upon reaching orbit, the satellite was assigned its Kosmos designation, and received the International Designator 1968-048A. The North American Air Defense Command assigned it the catalogue number 03279.

Kosmos 225 was the second of two DS-U1-Ya satellites to be launched, but the only one to successfully reach orbit; the DS-U1-Ya No.1 satellite having been lost in a launch failure, on 6 March 1968, due to a second stage malfunction, 216 seconds into its flight. It completed operations on 29 June 1968, before decaying from orbit and reentering the atmosphere on 2 November 1968.

See also

1968 in spaceflight

References

Spacecraft launched in 1968
Kosmos satellites
Dnepropetrovsk Sputnik program